StormCrawler is an open-source collection of resources for building low-latency, scalable web crawlers on Apache Storm. It is provided under Apache License and is written mostly in Java (programming language).

StormCrawler is modular and consists of a core module, which provides the basic building blocks of a web crawler such as fetching, parsing, URL filtering. Apart from the core components, the project also provides external resources, like for instance spout and bolts for Elasticsearch and Apache Solr or a ParserBolt which uses Apache Tika to parse various document formats.

The project is used in production by various companies.

Linux published a Q&A in October 2016 with the author of StormCrawler. InfoQ ran one in December 2016. A comparative benchmark with Apache Nutch was published in January 2017 on dzone.com.

Several research papers mentioned the use of StormCrawler, in particular:
 Crawling the German Health Web: Exploratory Study and Graph Analysis.
 The generation of a multi-million page corpus for the Persian language.
 The SIREN - Security Information Retrieval and Extraction engine.

The project WIKI contains a list of videos and slides available online.

StormCrawler is used notably by Common Crawl for generating a large and publicly available dataset of news.

See also

 Apache Storm
 Apache Nutch
 Apache Solr
 Elasticsearch

References

Web crawlers
Free software programmed in Java (programming language)
Software using the Apache license